Dragan Ljubisavljević  (born on December 22, 1979 in Kraljevo, Serbia) is a Serbian footballer (defender) playing currently for Mitra Kukar.

References

1979 births
Association football defenders
Association football midfielders
Expatriate footballers in Myanmar
Expatriate footballers in Indonesia
Expatriate footballers in North Macedonia
FK Vardar players
Liga 1 (Indonesia) players
Living people
Mitra Kukar players
Serbian expatriate footballers
Serbian footballers